Cyphastrea is a genus of massive reef building stony corals in the family Merulinidae, commonly known as brain coral.

Species
The World Register of Marine Species lists the following species:
Cyphastrea agassizi (Vaughan, 1907) - Agassiz's brain coral
Cyphastrea chalcidicum (Forsskål, 1775)
Cyphastrea decadia  Moll & Best, 1984
Cyphastrea hexasepta  Veron, Turak & DeVantier, 2000
Cyphastrea japonica  Yabe & Sugiyama, 1932
Cyphastrea kausti  Bouwmeester & Benzoni, 2015
Cyphastrea magna  Benzoni & Arrigoni, 2017
Cyphastrea microphthalma (Lamarck, 1816)
Cyphastrea ocellina (Dana, 1846) - ocellated brain coral
Cyphastrea salae  Baird, Hoogenboom & Huang, 2017
Cyphastrea serailia (Forsskål, 1775)
Cyphastrea zhongjianensis  Zou, 1980

References

Merulinidae
Taxa named by Henri Milne-Edwards
Taxa named by Jules Haime
Scleractinia genera